Petr Mocek (born December 8, 1980) is a Czech professional ice hockey defenceman. He played with HC Pardubice in the Czech Extraliga during the 2010–11 Czech Extraliga season.

Mocek previously played for HC Košice, HC Hradec Králové and HC Chrudim.

References

External links

1980 births
Czech ice hockey defencemen
HC Chrudim players
HC Dukla Jihlava players
HC Dvůr Králové nad Labem players
HC Dynamo Pardubice players
SK Horácká Slavia Třebíč players
Stadion Hradec Králové players
Living people
Hokki players
HC Karlovy Vary players
HC Košice players
Rytíři Kladno players
HC Vrchlabí players
Yuzhny Ural Orsk players
Sportspeople from Pardubice
Czech expatriate ice hockey players in Finland
Czech expatriate ice hockey players in Russia
Czech expatriate ice hockey players in Slovakia